Jakub Kałuziński (born 31 October 2002) is a Polish professional footballer who plays as a midfielder for Lechia Gdańsk.

Career statistics

Club

References

2002 births
Living people
Polish footballers
Association football midfielders
Poland youth international footballers
Poland under-21 international footballers
Lechia Gdańsk players
Lechia Gdańsk II players
Ekstraklasa players
IV liga players